USS Columbia was a  light cruiser of the United States Navy, which were built during World War II. The class was designed as a development of the earlier s, the size of which had been limited by the First London Naval Treaty. The start of the war led to the dissolution of the treaty system, but the dramatic need for new vessels precluded a new design, so the Clevelands used the same hull as their predecessors, but were significantly heavier. The Clevelands carried a main battery of twelve  guns in four three-gun turrets, along with a secondary armament of twelve  dual-purpose guns.

The ship, the sixth US Navy ship to bear the name, was named for the city of Columbia, South Carolina. Columbia was commissioned in July 1942, and saw service in several campaigns in the Pacific. Like almost all her sister ships, she was decommissioned shortly after the end of the war, and never saw active service again. Columbia was scrapped in the early 1960s. A memorial to the ship and men who served on her exists in Columbia, SC.

Design

Following the start of World War II in September 1939, Britain announced it would suspend the treaty for the duration of the conflict, a decision the US Navy quickly followed. Though still neutral, the United States recognized that war was likely and the urgent need for additional ships ruled out an entirely new design, so the Clevelands were a close development of the earlier s, the chief difference being the substitution of a two-gun  dual-purpose gun mount for one of the main battery  gun turrets.

The ship was powered by four General Electric steam turbines, each driving one propeller shaft, using steam provided by four oil-fired Babcock & Wilcox boilers. Her crew numbered 1285 officers and enlisted men.

The ship was armed with a main battery of twelve 6 in /47 caliber Mark 16 guns in four 3-gun turrets on the centerline. Two were placed forward in a superfiring pair; the other two turrets were placed aft of the superstructure in another superfiring pair. The secondary battery consisted of twelve  /38 caliber dual purpose guns mounted in twin turrets. Two of these were placed on the centerline, one directly behind the forward main turrets and the other just forward of the aft turrets. Two more were placed abreast of the conning tower and the other pair on either side of the aft superstructure. Anti-aircraft defense consisted of eight Bofors  guns in two quadruple mounts and thirteen Oerlikon  guns in single mounts.

The main battery turrets were protected with  faces and  sides and tops, and they were supported by barbettes 6 inches thick. Columbias conning tower had 5-inch sides.

Service history
Columbia was laid down on 19 August 1940 by the New York Shipbuilding Corp., Camden, New Jersey; and launched on 17 December 1941 sponsored by Miss J. A. Paschal. She was commissioned on 29 July 1942, with Captain W. A. Heard in command.

World War II

1942-43
Sailing from Norfolk on 9 November 1942, Columbia arrived at Espiritu Santo, New Hebrides on 10 December, and joined in the patrols west of the New Hebrides in support of the continuing struggle for Guadalcanal. On 29 January 1943, while cruising off Rennell Island to cover the movement of transports to Guadalcanal, Columbias group came under heavy air attack, and the battle of Rennell Island followed, with land and carrier-based aircraft joining in to protect the American ships. Columbia aided in shooting down three enemy planes in this battle. Based out of Efate from 1 February, Columbia continued her patrols in the Solomons, and in June carried out a bombardment and mining mission on 29–30 June, coordinated with the New Georgia landings. On 11–12 July, she bombarded Munda, and until 5 September, when she sailed for a brief overhaul at Sydney, patrolled southeast of the Solomons.

Columbia, rejoined her division on 24 September off Vella LaVella, as patrols to intercept Japanese shipping continued. As Marines stormed ashore on Bougainville on 1 November, Columbias guns pounded targets on Buka and Bonis and in the Shortlands. On the night of 2 November, her force intercepted a Japanese group sailing to attack transports lying off Bougainville. In the furious fighting of the Battle of Empress Augusta Bay which resulted, Columbia joined in sinking the Japanese cruiser  and destroyer , and turning the attackers back from their goal. She continued to support the Bougainville landings and bombard targets in the Solomons through December.

1944
After training exercises in the New Hebrides in January 1944, Columbia helped spearhead the attack and occupation of Nissan, one of the Green Islands from 13 to 18 February. Early in March, her group swept along the line between Truk and Kavieng in search of enemy shipping, then covered the assault and occupation of Emirau Island from 17 to 23 March. On 4 April, Columbia sailed from Port Purvis in the Solomon Islands for an overhaul at San Francisco, returning to the Solomons on 24 August.

Columbia sortied from Port Purvis on 6 September with the covering force for the landings in the Palaus, and remained off Peleliu to provide gunfire support to forces ashore and protection to assault shipping until her return to Manus on 28 September. She sailed on 6 October, guarding the force which was to seize Dinagat and other islands at the entrance of Leyte Gulf which must be neutralized before the vast Leyte invasion fleet could enter the Gulf. These islands were taken on 17 October, and Columbia sailed on to give gunfire cover to the main landings three days later. But as the landings proceeded, the Japanese fleet sailed south to give battle, and on the night of 24 October, its southern force entered Leyte Gulf through Surigao Strait. Attacks by motor torpedo boats and destroyers on the Japanese force opened this phase of the decisive battle for Leyte Gulf. Columbia with other cruisers had joined the old battleships and lay in wait. In a classical maneuver, the American ships "crossed the T" of the Japanese column, and opened heavy gunfire which sank the battleship , and forced the heavily damaged cruiser  and other units to retire. Toward dawn, Columbia sped to deliver the final blows which sank destroyer , crippled in earlier attacks.

After replenishing at Manus early in November, Columbia returned to Leyte Gulf to protect reinforcement convoys from air attack. In December, operating from Kossol Roads in the Palaus, she covered Army landings on Mindoro, and on 14 December, lost four of her men when a  gun misfired during an air attack. These were Columbias first casualties of the war.

1945 

On 1 January 1945, Columbia sailed for the landings in Lingayen Gulf and on 6 January, as pre-invasion bombardments were getting underway, Japanese kamikaze attacks began. Columbia suffered a near miss by a kamikaze and was then struck on her port quarter by a second. The plane and its bomb penetrated two decks before exploding, killing 13 (including 3 survivors of the  who had been rescued two days earlier after their ship was sunk following a kamikaze attack) and wounding 44 men, putting her aft turrets out of action, and setting the ship afire. Prompt flooding of two magazines prevented further explosions, and impressive damage control measures enabled Columbia to complete her bombardment with her two operative forward turrets, and remain in action to give close support to underwater demolition teams. Ammunition was removed from the after magazines to refill the forward magazines; much of this was done by hand. On the morning of the landings, 9 January, as Columbia lay close inshore and so surrounded by landing craft that she was handicapped in maneuver, she was again struck by a kamikaze, knocking out six gun directors and a gun mount. 24 men were killed and 97 wounded, but short-handed as she was, Columbia again put out fires, repaired damage, and continued her bombardment and fire support. Columbia sailed that night, guarding a group of unloaded transports. Her crew's accomplishments in saving their ship and carrying out their mission without interruption were recognized with the Navy Unit Commendation for this operation.

Columbia received emergency repairs at San Pedro Bay, Leyte, and sailed on to an overhaul on the west coast, returning to Leyte on 16 June. Three days later, she sailed for Balikpapan, Borneo, off which she lay from 28 June, guarding minesweeping which preceded the invasion of the island on 1 July. She covered the landing of Australian troops, and gave them gunfire support through the next day, sailing then to join Task Force 95 (TF 95) in its repeated sweeps against Japanese shipping in the East China Sea. At the close of the war, she carried inspection parties to Truk, the important Japanese base bypassed during the war, and carried Army passengers between Guam, Saipan, and Iwo Jima until sailing for home on 31 October.

After calling on the west coast, Columbia arrived at Philadelphia on 5 December for overhaul and service training Naval Reserve men until 1 July 1946. She was decommissioned and placed in reserve at Philadelphia on 30 November 1946, and sold for scrapping on 18 February 1959. The tug that towed Columbia to the breakers,  Curtis Bay Towing's Triton, had been one of the tugs present at her launching 18 years earlier.

Awards
In addition to the Navy Unit Commendation, Columbia received 10 battle stars for World War II service.

Footnotes

Notes

Citations

References

External links

 Cleveland class light cruisers US Cruisers List: US Light/Heavy/AntiAircraft Cruisers, Part 2
 USS Columbia (CL-56) HistoryofWar.org
 "Cruisers Are A Tough Breed." Popular Mechanics, November 1945, pp. 17–21, article based on wartime logs.

Cleveland-class cruisers
World War II cruisers of the United States
Ships built by New York Shipbuilding Corporation
1941 ships